Ramón Martínez (31 August 1948 – 25 January 2022) was a Venezuelan politician.

Biography
He was the Governor of the state of Sucre from 1992 to 1998 for the Movement for Socialism, and again from 2000 to 2008, first for Movement for Socialism and then for For Social Democracy. From 1998 to 2000 he was a member of the Venezuelan Senate. 

Martínez had previously been a member of the Venezuelan Chamber of Deputies. He died from COVID-19 on 25 January 2022, at the age of 73.

See also 
List of Governors of States of Venezuela

References 

1948 births
2022 deaths
Governors of Sucre (state)
Members of the Senate of Venezuela
Members of the Venezuelan Chamber of Deputies
Movement for Socialism (Venezuela) politicians
For Social Democracy politicians
People from Carúpano
Deaths from the COVID-19 pandemic in Venezuela